Prevalla is a ski resort and touristic village which approximately is 30 km away from Prizren, Kosovo and about twelve kilometers from Brezovica, the largest ski center in Kosovo. Prevalla (Prevalac) is a popular destination for hikers or skiers. The village borders a large forest. During the summer, people go there to relax and rest, whereas during the winter people visit it for its seasonal recreational sports. It lies 1800m above sea level. Prevalla (Prevalac) is located in the south of Kosovo in the Sharr Mountains, in the road leads from Prizren via Prevalla to Shtrpce (Strpce).

The region belongs to the Sharr Mountains National Park.

Gallery

Notes

References

External links 

 Fotografi nga Prevalla në verë dhe dimër, flickr.com
 The landmark Prevalla at Kosovo, Prevalla, village, maps.me
 Kosovo Photo: Prevalla, a very good place to go during summer., www.tripadvisor.com.au

Prizren
Ski areas and resorts in Kosovo
Šar Mountains